Acacia caerulescens, commonly known as limestone blue wattle, Buchan blue or Buchan blue wattle  is a tree species that is endemic to south eastern Australia.

Description
Like most species of Acacia it has phyllodes rather than true leaves. The lemon yellow globular flowerheads appear in racemes from November to December in the species' native range, followed by seed pods that are 5 to 12 cm long and 1.4 to 2.2 cm wide.

Taxonomy
The species was formally described in 1989 based on plant material collected near Buchan in Gippsland.

Distribution
It has a limited distribution in Victoria where it is only found in the Lakes Entrance and Buchan areas. It is found as remnant populations mostly in clay soils over limestone as a part of Eucalyptus woodland communities. Its natural habitat is under threat of land clearing.

See also
 List of Acacia species

References

caerulescens
Flora of Victoria (Australia)
Fabales of Australia
Plants described in 1989
Taxa named by Bruce Maslin